Angelidae is a family of mantises found in tropical Central and South Americas.

Taxonomy and systematics
The family Angelidae was formerly classified as a tribe or a subfamily of the family Mantidae and for a brief period also included the restored Asian tribe Euchomenellini The family as presently circumscribed is monotypic, containing the single genus Angela.

Species
The following species are recognised in the genus Angela:
 Angela armata
 Angela brachyptera
 Angela championi
 Angela decolor
 Angela guianensis (Rehn, 1906)
 Angela inermis 
 Angela lemoulti
 Angela maxima
 Angela minor 
 Angela miranda
 Angela ornata
 Angela perpulchra
 Angela peruviana
 Angela purpurascens
 Angela quinquemaculata
 Angela saussurii
 Angela subhyalina
 Angela trifasciata 
 Angela werneri

References

External links 

Mantodea families
Monogeneric insect families